Waltman is a surname. Notable people with the surname include:

Bob Waltman (1933–2010), American politician and businessman
Danny Waltman (born 1981), American soccer player
Kjell Waltman (1758–1799), Swedish actor
Mary Waltman, American actress
Michael Waltman (1946–2011), American actor
Retief Waltman (born 1938/39), South African golfer and Christian missionary
Royce Waltman (1942–2014), American college basketball coach
Sean Waltman (born 1972), American podcaster and wrestler